Italy rugby team may refer to:

 Italy national rugby league team
 Italy national rugby union team